The Portuguese Tomb of the Unknown Soldier (pt: Túmulo do Soldado Desconhecido) is located in the Sala do Capitulo at the Monastery of Batalha, near Leiria.

It holds the bodies of two soldiers of World War I – one from the battlefields of Flanders, and one from the African theatre – who were buried there on 6 April 1921.

References

External links
 
 

Tombs of Unknown Soldiers
Monuments and memorials in Portugal
World War I memorials in Portugal
Buildings and structures in Leiria District
Portuguese military memorials and cemeteries